Vibrac is a commune in the Charente-Maritime department in the Nouvelle-Aquitaine region in southwestern France.

Geography
The highest point in the canton of Jonzac, elevation 109 m, is situated in the commune of Vibrac. The Seugne forms all of the commune's western border.

Population

See also
Communes of the Charente-Maritime department

References

Communes of Charente-Maritime
Charente-Maritime communes articles needing translation from French Wikipedia